The North Coast and Guanyinshan National Scenic Area (abbreviated as North Guan) is a national scenic area in Taiwan.

It encompasses two separate sections of New Taipei City. The larger part consists of the seashore, part of the ocean, and a strip of land either side of Cape Fugui, the northernmost point of Taiwan. The smaller part of the Scenic Area is centred on the -high Mount Guanyin. The north coast area is between Wanli District and the boundary between Sanzhi District and Tamsui. Among them, Yehliu Scenic Area is characterized by special geology and topography.

The important scenic spots in the North Coast and Guanyin Mountain National Scenic Area include Fuji Fishing Port, Cape Fugui, Shimen Cave, Yeliu Tofu Rock, Jinshan Old Street, etc.

See also
 List of tourist attractions in Taiwan

References

External links

 North Coast & Guanyinshan National Scenic Area (governmental site)
 

2002 establishments in Taiwan
National scenic areas of Taiwan